

Seeds

Qualifiers

Lucky losers
  Estefanía Bottini /  Gala León García

Draw

First qualifier

Second qualifier

Third qualifier

Fourth qualifier

References
1995 US Open – Women's draws and results at the International Tennis Federation

Women's Doubles Qualifying
US Open (tennis) by year – Qualifying